Dry Cleaning is a 1997 French-Spanish drama film directed by Anne Fontaine and written by Fontaine and Gilles Taurand which stars Miou-Miou, Charles Berling, and Stanislas Merhar. The film won the Golden Osella for Best Screenplay at the 54th Venice International Film Festival.

Cast

Production 
The film is a Cinea, Les Films Alain Sarde and Maestranza Films French-Spanish co-production, with the participation of CNC, and Canal Plus.

Accolades

References

External links 
 

1997 films
1997 drama films
1990s French-language films
French drama films
Films directed by Anne Fontaine
1997 LGBT-related films
French LGBT-related films
LGBT-related drama films
Films featuring a Best Actress Lumières Award-winning performance
Films produced by Alain Sarde
Maestranza Films films
1990s French films